Leandro Vilas Boas Simioni (born 29 September 1974), also known as Leandro Testa, is a Brazilian former professional footballer. In December 2010 Simioni was involved in a car accident in Brazil, he was seriously injured and left paralyzed from the waist down.

Biography

Early career
Born in São Bernardo do Campo, São Paulo state, Leandro started his career with clubs of the state before moved to Belgian side Cercle Brugge.

Hong Kong and Japan
He then moved to Hong Kong and played for Golden, Sai Kung and Yee Hope. He was the top-scorer in 1999–2000 Hong Kong First Division League. He was also selected into Hong Kong League XI for several times. In January 2001 he left Yee Hope and was offered a contract from Matsubara of Brazil, which the club was invested by Japanese. He then left for J1 League club Yokohama F. Marinos. He left the club in July.

Return to Brazil
Leandro then returned to Brazil and played for Bahia (on loan from unnamed club), Santa Cruz and Paulista de Campo Limpo Paulista. He finished as the runner-up of 2002 Campeonato Pernambucano.

Germany and Israel
In June 2003 he left for 2. Bundesliga club Rot-Weiß Oberhausen. The club relegated to Regionalliga Nord in mid–2005. In March 2007 he was signed by Bandeirante of São Paulo state, played the second half of 2007 Campeonato Paulista Série A2, scored twice.

He then left for Israeli club Bnei Sakhnin and Hapoel Be'er Sheva. On 25 January 2010, he was signed by Maccabi Ironi Bat Yam.

Amateur
On 4 November 2010, he returned to Brazil again, signing for União da Vila Sá of Campeonato Paulista Amador do Estado.

References

External links

  
 
 
  

Living people
1974 births
People from São Bernardo do Campo
Brazilian footballers
Association football forwards
Hong Kong First Division League players
J1 League players
Israeli Premier League players
Associação Portuguesa de Desportos players
Cercle Brugge K.S.V. players
Sun Hei SC players
Yee Hope players
Yokohama F. Marinos players
Santa Cruz Futebol Clube players
Rot-Weiß Oberhausen players
Bnei Sakhnin F.C. players
Hapoel Be'er Sheva F.C. players
Maccabi Ironi Bat Yam F.C. players
Brazilian expatriate footballers
Expatriate footballers in Belgium
Expatriate footballers in Hong Kong
Expatriate footballers in Japan
Expatriate footballers in Germany
Expatriate footballers in Israel
Brazilian expatriate sportspeople in Belgium
Brazilian expatriate sportspeople in Hong Kong
Brazilian expatriate sportspeople in Japan
Brazilian expatriate sportspeople in Germany
Brazilian expatriate sportspeople in Israel
Footballers from São Paulo (state)